Aviv Daniel Avraham (or Daniel Avraham, ; born March 30, 1996) is an Israeli professional association footballer who plays as a midfielder for Israeli Premier League club Maccabi Netanya and the Israel national team.

Early life
Avraham was born in Afula, Israel, to an Ethiopian Jewish family, and he is the youngest brother amongst eight siblings.

International career
He has been a youth international since 2014. Between 2017–2018, he was part of Israel under-21s.

He was called up for the senior Israel national team on 14 November 2021, during their 2022 FIFA World Cup qualifiers - UEFA. He debuted for the senior team in a 3–2 home win for Israel against Faroe Islands on 15 November 2021, at the 2022 FIFA World Cup qualifiers - UEFA.

Honours
Toto Cup
Winner (1): 2022-23

References

1996 births
Living people
Israeli footballers
Maccabi Netanya F.C. players
Liga Leumit players
Israeli Premier League players
Footballers from Afula
Israel youth international footballers
Israel under-21 international footballers
Israel international footballers
Association football midfielders
20th-century Israeli Jews
21st-century Israeli Jews
Jewish Israeli sportspeople
Israeli people of Ethiopian-Jewish descent